Eugen Nagy (Naghi) (also known as Jenő Nagy; 16 April 1944 – 2006) was a Romanian professional footballer of Hungarian ethnicity. He played as a sweeper (libero) for teams such as FC Bihor Oradea or Voința Oradea and after retirement worked as a football coach in the youth center of FC Bihor.

Club career
Nagy played initially as a midfielder and made his debut in the Divizia A in 1964, for FC Bihor Oradea (named at that time as Crișul Oradea). Subsequently he started to play as a defender, especially as a sweeper (libero) and was for years one of the FC Bihor's captains and an important player.

Eugen Nagy played in approx. 270-280 matches (125 in the top-flight) for FC Bihor Oradea and scored 1 goal. He achieved a semi-final of the Romanian Cup during the 1975–76 season, best performance of the club in this competition.

Between 1977 and 1980, former captain of "the red and blues" played for the third tier club Voința Oradea, then retired in 1980, at 36 years. After retirement he worked as a coach in the youth center of FC Bihor.

Honours
Bihor Oradea
Divizia B: 1970–71, 1974–75

References

External links
Eugen Nagy at labtof.ro

1944 births
2006 deaths
Sportspeople from Oradea
Romanian footballers
Association football defenders
Association football midfielders
Liga I players
Liga II players
Stăruința Oradea players
FC Bihor Oradea players